Derwent College is a college of the University of York, and alongside Langwith College was one of the first two colleges to be opened following the university's inception. It is named after the local River Derwent. Both the original college building and the former Langwith college buildings are Grade II listed, making all of the current Derwent College premises Grade II listed.

The college itself is next to Heslington Hall, and close to the gazebo and gardens known collectively as The Quiet Place.

History
Derwent, alongside Langwith College is one of the founding colleges at the University of York. It was officially opened by Queen Elizabeth II on 22 October 1965.

Following Langwith's move to the Heslington East campus in 2012, its former buildings are now part of Derwent College.

Buildings and Services
Derwent College has twelve accommodation blocks, named A, B, C, D, E, F, G, H, J, K, M and P. Blocks A, B, C, D, J, K, M and P are standard university accommodation; they were built in the CLASP system, invented by Andrew Derbyshire, consisting of prefabricated concrete blocks and panels.

Block A is part of the main college nucleus, being the north-west and north-east sides of a small quadrangle, with the administrative offices and JCR on the south-east. B Block is situated nearer Heslington Hall overlooking the University Lake. C and D Blocks are also located near Heslington Hall and also form a single separate building in most important respects.

The original college only had A, B, and C blocks. Block D was added a few years later on a different floor plan with comparatively small individual rooms, but a large central kitchen and eating area. The older blocks had little communal space but somewhat larger rooms. Derwent College inherited the "Old Langwith" Blocks in 2012, when a new Langwith College was built on the Heslington East campus; blocks J, K, M and P are now part of the enlarged college.

There were also a small group of rooms known as "N Block" (N standing for nucleus) which were situated above the main kitchen. Originally these were used for guest accommodation, however they have since been converted to offices.

E, F, G and H Blocks are situated across the other side of University Road from the rest of the college, adjacent to Heslington Church field. They are more recently brick-build accommodation and some of these rooms offer en-suite bathroom facilities. Originally only two of these blocks belonged to Derwent, the other two were part of Langwith, prior to that college's move to the new East Campus, and collectively they were often referred to as "Derwith," and more contemporaneously as "Extension."

Further to the main blocks, Derwent students are also accommodated in Eden's Court which is situated on Heslington Lane. Eden's Court comprises eight houses, each of nine or ten rooms with similar layout to those of Halifax College. There are also two cottages, Eden's Cottage and Sycamore Cottage. Eden's Court is jocularly referred to by the other blocks of Derwent as 'Shutter Island', due to its isolation in being situated nearer to Halifax College than the Derwent nucleus. Eden's Court was not always affiliated to Derwent and its residents, mostly mature students, belonged to a range of colleges.

Facilities in Derwent include Computer Services classrooms and computer rooms, and the Derwent bar and dining room. During the day there is a main dining room, a snack bar and a drinks bar.

Derwent College is home to the University's Politics, Education, English & Related Literature and School of PEP departments  .

College Staff
The College Principal is a university academic who shares teaching duties with college responsibilities. The College Principal works with the College Manager, the College Administrator and the College Life Team. The current College Principal is Dr Eleanor Brown.

List of College Provosts/Heads of College/College Principals:
Professor Harry Rée (1965-1974)
Dr. Michael Green (1974-1980)
Dr. Ron Weir (1980-2009)
Dr. Rob Aitken (2009-2014)
Dr. Eleanor Brown (2014-present)

The current College Manager is Andrew Kerrigan, and the College Administrator is Chris Unwin.

Student life

Student representation
All undergraduate students of Derwent College are members of the Junior Common room, and continue to remain members throughout their time at the university. The Junior Common Room Committee is responsible for representing the interests of Derwent students, organising events, and promoting student well-being. The committee is elected annually from the undergraduate population, and consists of around 40 members.

All postgraduate students of Derwent College are members of the Graduate Common room, and continue to remain members throughout their time at the university. The Graduate Common Room Committee is responsible for representing the interests of Derwent students, organising events, and welfare provision. The committee is elected annually from the postgraduate population.

The 2023 JCRC Executive Committee is:

Chair - Isaac Hotchkiss
Vice Chairs - James Hansford and Joshua Wilson
Treasurer - Tom Sims
Head of Sports - Harvey Charlesworth and Tom Palmer
Heads of Events - Shiv Oza and Lucy Rutty
Head of Wellbeing - Moesha Snoek and Jessica Harrison

Events
Club D, a student club night on campus is organised through the Junior Common room. This is held periodically at weekends during term time in the Derwent bar and dining room. 

The college also holds the annual Big-D (formerly known as Derwent BBQ). It is an end of year event along the lines of Club D, but on a larger scale. Taking up the whole area in and around the college, it is normally held on the first Monday after exams and has several rooms of music, bars and food, and open air activities.

Notable acts include Scouting for Girls and Macky Gee.

Sports 
11th November - 13th November will see the 'Battle of the Birds' held between Derwent College and James College.

Notable people
Famous past members of the College include Greg Dyke (politics alumnus and former University Chancellor), Jung Chang and Harry Enfield.

References

External links
Derwent College JCRC
Derwent College - University pages

Colleges of the University of York
1965 establishments in England
Educational institutions established in 1965
Grade II listed buildings in York
Grade II listed educational buildings